Community Group is the second solo album by the American musician Jonathan Jones, self-released in 2011.

Track listing 

2011 albums
Jonathan Jones (musician) albums